Andrew Crawford may refer to:

Andrew Crawford (actor) (1917–1994), British actor
Andrew Crawford (neuroscientist) (born 1949), British neuroscientist
Andrew Crawford (entrepreneur) (born 1971), Irish entrepreneur
Andrew Crawford (dancer), Australian dancer
Andrew Crawford (knight), 13th–14th century Scottish knight
Andy Crawford (1960s footballer), goalkeeper
Andy Crawford (footballer, born 1967) (born 1967), footballer and coach, mostly in the US
Andy Crawford (footballer, born 1959) English footballer